Fortunatus is person mentioned by St Paul in I Corinthians 16:17: I was glad when Stephanas, Fortunatus, and Achaicus arrived, because they have supplied what was lacking from you.

Church traditions
Fortunatus was a disciple from Corinth, of Roman birth or origin, as his name indicates, who visited Paul at Ephesus, most probably with contributions; and returned, along with Stephanus and Achaicus, in charge of that apostle's first Epistle to the Corinthian Church.

Hymns
Troparion (Tone 3)   
Holy apostle Fortunatus of the Seventy;
Entreat the merciful;
To grant our souls forgiveness of transgressions.

Kontakion  (Tone 4 )
The Church ever sees you as a shining star, O apostle Fortunatus,
Your miracles have manifested great enlightenment.
Therefore we cry out to Christ:
"Save those who with faith honor Your apostle, O Most Merciful One."

See also
 Other saints Fortunatus

References

Bibliography

Apostle Fortunatus of the Seventy - OCA website

Seventy disciples
Christian saints from the New Testament
Christianity in Roman Corinth
Year of birth missing
Year of death unknown